The 2014 FC Zhetysu season was the 8th successive season that the club playing in the Kazakhstan Premier League, the highest tier of association football in Kazakhstan, and 18th in total. Zhetysu finished the season in 8th position, whilst also being knocked out of the Kazakhstan Cup at the First-Round by Gefest.

In September 2014, Omari Tetradze and his coaching staff left Zhetysu by mutual consent.

Squad

Transfers

Winter

In:

Out:

Summer

In:

Out:

Friendlies

Competitions

Kazakhstan Premier League

First round

Results summary

Results

League table

Relegation Round

Results summary

Results

Table

Kazakhstan Cup

Squad statistics

Appearances and goals

|-
|colspan="14"|Players who appeared for Zhetysu that left during the season:

|}

Goal scorers

Disciplinary record

References

External links
 Official Site

Zhet
FC Zhetysu seasons